Concourson-sur-Layon (literally Concourson on Layon) is a former commune in the Maine-et-Loire department in western France. On 30 December 2016, it was merged into the new commune Doué-en-Anjou.

Geography
The village lies in the middle of the commune, on the right bank of the Layon, which flows northwestward through the commune.

See also
Communes of the Maine-et-Loire department

References

Concoursonsurlayon